Messelogale ("weasel from Messel") is an extinct genus of placental mammals from clade Carnivoraformes, that lived in Europe during middle Eocene.

Phylogeny
The phylogenetic relationships of genus Messelogale are shown in the following cladogram:

See also
 Mammal classification
 Carnivoraformes
 Miacidae

References

†
Miacids
Prehistoric monotypic mammal genera
Eocene mammals of Europe
Prehistoric placental genera